Masjed is a village in Ajorluy-ye Gharbi Rural District, Baruq District, Miandoab County, West Azerbaijan Province, Iran. At the 2006 census, its population was 171, in 43 families.

References 

Populated places in Miandoab County